Nerf Legends is a first-person shooter video game developed by Fun Labs and published by GameMill Entertainment. It was released on 19 November 2021 for Microsoft Windows, Nintendo Switch, PlayStation 4, PlayStation 5, Xbox One, and Xbox Series X/S.

Gameplay 
Nerf Legends has an expansive single-player mode, featuring battles against robots and mystifications that need to be answered with the use of Nerf blasters. There's also online multiplayer which features both eight-person free-for-all and four-person platoon matches. Players are suitable to customize their icon with a variety of armor pieces. The color of blasters can also be customized to the player's relish.

The game features single-player and offline or online multiplayer modes. Players have access to 15 authentic Nerf blasters from the Mega, Ultra and Elite lines, including some new ordnance from this time. The crusade will take you through 19 futuristic sci-fi surroundings where you will face off against legions of robot mugs and their master battle elders. The online multiplayer mode supports up to eight players, and you will be suitable to duke it out in 4v4 platoon-grounded matches or free-for-all rounds. Players can trick shots to throw off the adversaries and employ special darts, including glamorous pull darts, push darts, candidate darts, and slow darts.

Development 
The game was announced on 11 August 2021. A trailer for the game was released the same day.

Reception 

IGN'''s Travis Northup gave for Nerf Legends'' a 2/10, summarizing it as "a broken, painful slog that you shouldn't even consider playing as a joke."

References

External links
Official website

2021 video games
First-person shooters
Nintendo Switch games
PlayStation 4 games
PlayStation 5 games
Unreal Engine games
Video games based on toys
GameMill Entertainment games
Video games developed in Romania
Windows games
Xbox One games
Xbox Series X and Series S games
Fun Labs games
Multiplayer and single-player video games